The Dark Circle is a criminal organization appearing in media published by DC Comics, primarily as an enemy of the Legion of Super-Heroes. They first appeared in 1968, created by Jim Shooter as a criminal organization founded by five members and populated by a multitude of clones of the original five members.

The Dark Circle concept was later modified to consist of members from five core worlds instead of clones. A later version, after DC Comics rebooted their history, was led by Brainiac 4 and had several known Legion of Super-Heroes enemies among their ranks instead of the previous generic masked henchmen.

Fictional history
The Dark Circle first appeared in Adventure Comics #367 as an insurgent group planning to conquer the United Planets in the 30th century. It was composed of only five people and armies of clones created from those five people. The Dark Circle remained mostly shrouded in mystery, even with its defeat by the Legion of Super-Heroes.

They launched a direct invasion of Earth during the Legion's Adventure Comics run, following an attack by the Fatal Five that had left the Legion and Earth's defenses devastated, and were in the process of overwhelming both when Brainiac 5 discovered the Miracle Machine and used it to repulse the attack, returning all the Dark Circle soldiers to their homeworlds.

They then sought to invade Earth indirectly through others, most notably the Khunds and Dominators whom they manipulated into what became known as the Earthwar. As part of their machinations, they also released Mordru, hoping to use him against the Legion. This proved to be a mistake, however, as Mordru instead gained control of the Dark Circle. This was not immediately apparent, though, as he continued with the plans they had already drawn up. Eventually Mordru and the Circle were defeated.

The Dark Circle was referenced during the Giffen-Bierbaum continuity. Members were depicted wearing hoods with a prominent dark circle (zero) over the face. In Legion of Super-Heroes Annual #2, they were said to have existed for millions of years, even before New Genesis and Apokolips. They had little influence over events and were outmaneuvered by other factions who were prominent during this period. The Legion member Tellus joined the Dark Circle during this time. 

Instead of five individuals cloned, now they were formed primarily from five worlds.

The Circle here was portrayed as more of a philosophical or quasi-religious movement, one which specifically turned aside from intellectual knowledge, and instead focused on emotions, primarily those termed "blood" emotions such as anger and fear. They did maintain a high level of technology however, with a renegade Dominator world supplying most of the tech. Their primary foe, as depicted in LSH Annual #2 (v4) was Valor, who not only opposed them physically, but philosophically as well. The influence of Valor on many worlds was the main obstacle to their plans.

When the Dominators conquered the earth, the Dark Circle secretly aided the resistance movement, hoping to gain control of the planet themselves, but the group was ultimately betrayed by its ally, Universo.

Post-Zero Hour
The Dark Circle also played a part in the post-Zero Hour reboot of the Legion, in which it was the secret power behind the Affiliated Planets (a rival political grouping to the United Planets) and was run by Brainiac 4. Other members of the Circle included Tyr, and the leaders of the Khunds, the Gil'Dishpan, the Dominators, and the Sklarian Raiders. All were killed by Brainiac 4 when they realized the level of her insanity.

Members
 Ontiir - A member of the Dark Circle from the planet Tsauron. Killed by Kimball Zendak.
 Grullug Garkush - A member of the Dark Circle from the planet N'cron.
 Norak Kun - A member of the Dark Circle from the planet Naltor.
 Gorgoth - A member of the Dark Circle from the planet Fresish.
 Rolind Siepur - A member of the Dark Circle from the planet Arane II.

Other versions
In issue three of the Tangent: Superman's Reign series, a version of the Dark Circle is briefly seen. This version is a necromancer cult, with such members as Etrigan, Bane and Sargon.

Phantom Stranger antagonist
An unrelated Dark Circle appeared as Phantom Stranger's adversaries in Phantom Stranger #20 (July–August 1972). This organization, in which operated also the alchemist/sorcerer named Tannarak, was under control of the demonic sorceress named Tala.

In other media
 The Dark Circle appears in the Legion of Super Heroes episode "In Your Dreams". Its leaders, Gullug (voiced by Dave Wittenberg) and Ontirr (voiced by Bumper Robinson), become aware of the Legion of Super Heroes via Dream Girl and plan to capture her to use her precognitive abilities to their advantage.

 The Dark Circle appear as the main antagonists in the Legion of Super-Heroes animated film. This version was founded by Brainiac in the 21st century to enable his resurrection, and persists into the 31st century. It also has gone by many names such as the Black Circle, Oraborus, the Beginning and the End.

DC Comics supervillain teams
Legion of Super-Heroes